The 1948 San Francisco State Gators football team represented San Francisco State College—now known as San Francisco State University—as a member of the Far Western Conference (FWC) during the 1948 college football season. Led by sixth-year head coach Dick Boyle, San Francisco State compiled an overall record of 3–5 with a mark of 2–2 in conference play, placing third in the FWC. For the season the team was outscored by its opponents 137 to 63. The Gators played home games at Cox Stadium in San Francisco.

At the end of the season, the Gators were invited to participate in the second annual Fruit Bowl. Held on December 5, it was the first interracial bowl game played in the United States. San Francisco State lost to Southwestern Athletic Conference (SWAC) champion Southern by a score of 30–0.

Schedule

References

San Francisco State
San Francisco State Gators football seasons
San Francisco State Gators football